Helveticosaurus is an extinct genus of diapsid marine reptile known from the Middle Triassic (Anisian-Ladinian boundary) of southern Switzerland. It contains a single species, Helveticosaurus zollingeri, known from the nearly complete holotype T 4352 collected at Cava Tre Fontane of Monte San Giorgio, an area well known for its rich record of marine life during the Middle Triassic.

Description and paleobiology
 
Helveticosaurus is known from a nearly complete holotype which includes the premaxilla, maxilla, prefrontal, postfrontal, postorbital, squamosal, dentary and a postcranial skeleton. Several disarticulated elements are also known including teeth, portions of the snout and poscranial elements. It possessed many features that were adaptations to a marine lifestyle in the shallow-sea environment that existed in Europe at the time when much of the continent was part of the Tethys Ocean. The long, flexible tail is similar to what can be seen in other extinct marine reptiles such as thalattosaurs, and it probably propelled itself through the water by means of lateral undulation. However, Helveticosaurus also possessed a robust pectoral girdle and forelimbs that were well adapted for paddle like propulsion as a supplementary method of locomotion, as seen in secondarily aquatic tetrapods. This unique combination of undulation and paddling is highly unusual for an aquatic reptile.

The caniniform teeth suggest a predatory lifestyle for Helveticosaurus. Unlike most other marine reptiles which exhibited a lengthening and narrowing of the skull, the head of Helveticosaurus was more robust and boxlike. It is unknown what purpose the shortness of the skull would have had in feeding.

Relationship with other sauropsids
Upon its naming and description in 1955, Helveticosaurus was classified as a member of the order Placodontia, a group of robust, barrel-bodied marine reptiles similar in lifestyle to the extant marine iguana. It was seen as a basal member of the clade, being assigned to the new family Helveticosauridae of the Helveticosauroidea superfamily.

Despite the dorsal vertebrae, which are very similar to those of placodonts, the genus lacks many of the autapomorphies characteristic of sauropterygians and thus evolved from a different ancestor, independently adapting a marine lifestyle.    
 
Its affinities with other diapsids are unclear, as it differs greatly from any other known types of marine reptiles, with no apparent close relatives. It shares some characteristics with archosauromorphs, and may be related to that group. One 2013 analysis of fossil reptile relationships found Helveticosaurus, together with Eusaurosphargis and Saurosphargis, to be most closely related to either the ichthyopterygians or sauropterygians in a large clade of marine reptiles within archosauromorpha. Most recent phylogenetic analyses recover a sister taxon relationship between Helveticosaurus and Eusaurosphargis, with one analysis recovering them at successive positions instead. The following cladogram is simplified after the phylogenetic analysis of Li et al. (2014), which includes Eusaurosphargis, Helveticosaurus and all known saurosphargid species. The removal / inclusion of Ichthyopterygia was found to affect the topology the most - switching the positions of the Eusaurosphargis+Helveticosaurus and Thalattosauriformes clades, and altering the positions of several taxa within Eosauropterygia, which are not shown.

Possible relatives
Pelvic material from SVT 203, found from older Early Triassic strata in Spitsbergen, may share similarities with the pelvic material known from Helveticosaurus. However, this is only if the anterior element of the pelvic girdle in Helveticosaurus is interpreted as the pubis. The pubis of SVT 203 also shares similarities with placodonts, although the ischium differs in lacking constriction. SVT 203 was once referred to the ichthyosaur Grippia longirostris, but the pubis, femur, metatarsals, and phalanges suggest that it is not from an ichthyopterygian, therefore making it more probable that it belongs to a taxon related, and possibly ancestral, to Helveticosaurus, although more material is needed to give a definitive confirmation. The small size of material comprising SVT 203 in relation to Helveticosaurus, along with the compression seen on both ends of the femur, may indicate that it is a juvenile form of the species to which it belongs, but both temporal and geographical separation of SVT 203 with Helveticosaurus makes size comparison as a means of determining immaturity unnecessary, as it is possible that Helveticosaurus evolved from an ancestor that was smaller in overall size.

References

External links
Helveticosaurus in the Paleobiology Database
Tetrapod Zoology post on Helveticosaurus

Prehistoric neodiapsids
Middle Triassic reptiles of Europe
Prehistoric marine reptiles
Prehistoric reptile genera
Anisian life